Dog Island is an uninhabitated small island of  located approximately  to the north-west of Anguilla.  It is low and rocky, with three small cays off the west and north coasts. The coastline is characterised by low cliffs alternating with sandy beaches. Large ponds lie inside two of the beaches. Dog Island lies west of the Prickley Pear Cays.

Flora and fauna
The central part of the island is covered in thorny scrub with prickly pear.  The island, with the adjacent cays, has been identified as an Important Bird Area by BirdLife International because it is home to large numbers of nesting seabirds, mainly sooty terns with over 100,000 pairs recorded.  Other seabirds breeding in smaller numbers include red-billed tropicbirds, magnificent frigatebirds, masked and brown boobies, laughing gulls, bridled terns and brown noddies. Reptiles present include the Anguilla Bank ameiva, Anguilla Bank anole, little dwarf gecko, island least gecko and a Mabuya skink.  There are also feral goats.

References

Uninhabited islands of Anguilla
Important Bird Areas of Anguilla
Seabird colonies